Atrichocera moultoni is a genus of beetles in the family Cerambycidae. It is found in Malaysia.

References

Apomecynini
Beetles described in 1911